Shijia Township is a township in Shizhu Tujia Autonomous County, Chongqing, China.

Administrative division
As of 2016, the township is divided into five villages: 
 Shilong 
 Huanglong 
 Fenghuang 
 Jiulong 
 Anqiao

History
In 1932, it was known as "Shijia". In 1940 it was renamed "Shijia Township".

Economy
The economy of the township is mainly based on agriculture. The main crops of the region are grains, followed by medicinal materials, vegetables, and tobacco.

Transportation
The China National Highway G350 passes through the township west to east.

References

Townships of Chongqing
Divisions of Shizhu Tujia Autonomous County